The following is a list of football stadiums in Luxembourg. The list includes total stadium capacity not just seating capacity.

See also